Microptilium is a genus of beetles belonging to the family Ptiliidae.

The species of this genus are found in Europe.

Species:
 Microptilium geistautsi Dybas, 1961 
 Microptilium palustre Kuntzen, 1914

References

Ptiliidae